Qaluy Rasul Aqa (also Romanized as Qālūy Rasūl Āqā; also known as Qālūy Bāsūdlān, Qālū Rasūl Āqā and Qālū Seydūlān) is a village in Il Gavark Rural District, in the Central District of Bukan County, West Azerbaijan Province, Iran. At the 2006 census, its population was 446, in 62 families.

References 

Populated places in Bukan County